FC Reading Revolution was an American soccer team based in Reading, Pennsylvania, United States. Founded in 2009, the team played in the National Premier Soccer League (NPSL), a national amateur league at the fourth tier of the American Soccer Pyramid, in the Northeast Keystone Division.

The team played its home games at Shirk Stadium on the campus of Albright College.  The team's colors were red, black and silver.

History

Players

2010 Roster
Source:

Notable former players
  Max Ferdinand

Year-by-year

Head coaches
  Mike Moyer (2009–present)

Stadia
 Shirk Stadium at Albright College; Reading, Pennsylvania (2009–present)

External links
 FC Reading Revolution

National Premier Soccer League teams
Amateur soccer teams in Pennsylvania
Soccer clubs in Pennsylvania
Sports in Reading, Pennsylvania
2009 establishments in Pennsylvania